Amydrium sinense  is a flowering plant in genus Amydrium of the arum family Araceae.

Distribution 
Its native range is South China to North Vietnam.

References 

Monsteroideae